Luzhu District  may refer to:

 Lujhu District, Kaohsiung (路竹區), district of Kaohsiung, Taiwan
 Luzhu District, Taoyuan (蘆竹區), district of Taoyuan, Taiwan